Patrick Grant may refer to:

Patrick Grant (moderator) (1706–1787), Scottish minister and moderator of the General Assembly of the Church of Scotland
Patrick Grant (Indian Army officer) (1804–1895), Indian Army officer and colonial administrator
Patrick Grant (Australian politician), New South Wales politician and newspaperman
Patrick Grant (composer) (born 1963), American composer and performer
Patrick Grant (designer) (born 1972), Scottish fashion designer
Patrick Grant, Lord Elchies (1690–1754), Scottish judge
Patrick Grant (rosarian) (1860–1945), Scottish-born Australian rose breeder
Sir Patrick Grant, 14th Baronet (born 1953), Scottish baronet and businessman
Patrick Grant (American football) (1886–1927), American football player
Haras Fyre (also known as Patrick Grant; born 1953), American singer-songwriter